Salkeld may refer to:

 Bill Salkeld (1917–1967), American baseball player
 Blanaid Salkeld (1880–1959), Irish poet, dramatist, and actor
 John Louis Salkeld (1858–1941), Canadian farmer and political figure
 Lancelot Salkeld (1475–1560), last Prior and then first Dean of Carlisle 
 Philip Salkeld (1830–1857), British soldier
 Roger Salkeld (born 1971), American baseball player
 Trent Salkeld, Australian rugby league footballer
 William Salkeld (1671-1715) English legal writer (Salkeld's Reports)

See also
 Great Salkeld
 Little Salkeld
 Salkeld Hall